De Luz, DeLuz or Deluz may refer to:

Places
De Luz, California
Deluz, France

People
Joaquín De Luz